Jovan Mijušković (Serbian Cyrillic: Јован Мијушковић; 17 September 1886 – 27 November 1944) was a Serbian doctor and Minister of Social Policy and People's Health in the Nazi-controlled Government of National Salvation.

He was executed extrajudicially by Yugoslav Partisans during a series of summary executions upon their taking of power in 1944.

References 

1886 births
1944 deaths
Politicians from Niš
Serbian physicians
Executed Serbian collaborators with Nazi Germany
People killed by Yugoslav Partisans